AB32 or variant thereof may mean:

 AB postcode area, the Aberdeen postcode area
 Global Warming Solutions Act of 2006, a California law concerning greenhouse gas emission reduction known as Assembly Bill 32 (AB 32)
 A Turkish patrol ship of the Türk class